Harold Holmes (1894-1954) was an Australian rugby league footballer who played in the 1910s and 1920s who played for Western Suburbs, South Sydney and Eastern Suburbs in the NSWRL competition.  His position was at second-row.

Playing career
Holmes made his first grade debut for Western Suburbs against Annandale at St Luke's Park now known as Concord Oval.  Holmes scored a try in a 11–6 victory.  The following year, Holmes switched clubs and joined South Sydney.  In his first year with Souths, Holmes played 13 games as the club won the 1918 premiership.  In 1921, Holmes joined arch rivals Eastern Suburbs and in 1923 was a member of the premiership winning team that year defeating his former club Souths 15–12 in the grand final played at the Sydney Cricket Ground.  Holmes played one further season and retired at the end of 1924.

References

1894 births
1954 deaths
Australian rugby league players
Sydney Roosters players
South Sydney Rabbitohs players
Western Suburbs Magpies players
Rugby league second-rows
Rugby league players from Sydney